The Codex Corbeiensis II, designated by ff2 or 8 (in the Beuron system), is a 5th-century Latin Gospel Book. The text, written on vellum, is a version of the old Latin. The manuscript contains 190 parchment folio with the text of the four Gospels with lacunae (Matt 1:1-11:16; Luke 9:48; 10:20.21; 11:45-12:6.7; John 17:15-18:9; 20:22-21:8). Written in a beautiful round uncial hand.

Gospels follow in the sequence: Matthew, Luke, John, Mark.

The Latin text of the codex is a representative Western text-type in itala recension. The text is akin to preserved in Codex Vercellensis and Codex Veronensis.

The manuscript formerly belonged to the monastic Library of Corbie Abbey, on the Somme, near Amiens; and with the most important part of that Library was transferred to St. Germain des Prés at Paris, about the year 1638, and was there numbered 195. 
It was quoted by Sabatier, Bianchini gave a collation in Mark, Luke, and John. Full text was published by Johannes Belsheim, Augustine Calmet, 
Migne, and Jülicher.

Currently it is housed at the National Library of France (Lat. 17225) at Paris.

See also 

 List of New Testament Latin manuscripts
 Codex Corbeiensis I

References

Further reading 

 Augustine Calmet, Commentarius literalis in omnes libros Novi Testamenti Latinis litteris traditus a Ioanne Dominico Mansi, Würzburg, Vol. 2 (1787), p. 276-302. 
 
 E. S. Buchanan, The four Gospels from the Codex Corbeiensis ff2 (Old Latin Biblical Texts, v; Oxford, 1907), pp. 1–96. 
 A. Jülicher, Itala. Das Neue Testament in Altlateinischer Überlieferung, Walter de Gruyter, Berlin, New York, 1976. (Marcus Evangelium)

Vetus Latina New Testament manuscripts
5th-century biblical manuscripts

External links 
Manuscript images online at the National Library of France.